Andrew Robert Kirk (born 29 May 1979) is a Northern Irish former professional footballer and the current manager of Brechin City, in the Highland League.

Kirk played for Glentoran, Heart of Midlothian, Boston United, Northampton Town, Yeovil Town, Dunfermline Athletic and Alloa Athletic. He was also capped by Northern Ireland. He began his managerial career with Hearts Women before joining Brechin City in 2021.

Early life
Andy Kirk is the son of former footballer and former Lisburn Distillery manager Paul Kirk.

Playing career

Club

Glentoran
Kirk started his career with Belfast side Glentoran and quickly established himself as one of the top strikers in the Irish League, scoring 26 league goals in the 1998-99 season.

Kirk enjoyed a successful time with the Glens and under manager Roy Coyle winning the Gold Cup, County Antrim Shield and Irish Premiership title.

Heart of Midlothian
Having had several unsuccessful trials in England. In February 1999 Jim Jefferies signed Kirk for Heart of Midlothian for £50,000.

Initially viewed as an investment for the future, Kirk played in the club's U-21 side for most of his first two seasons at Tynecastle Stadium. However, in 2000–01 he firmly established himself in the first eleven, making 40 appearances and scoring 13 times. After a season decimated by injuries, he made further double-figure scoring contributions in 2002–03 and 2003–04. However, financial restraints at the Edinburgh club resulted in Kirk being released when his contract expired in the summer of 2004.

Boston United
Steve Evans signed Kirk for English League Two side Boston United. Kirk excelled at York Street, scoring 20 goals in little over 8 months.

Northampton Town
In March 2005 Kirk signed for Northampton Town for a £125,000 fee, signing a three and half-year contract.

Despite Kirk scoring on his debut, Northampton lost to Rushden & Diamonds and a stuttering finish to the season witnessed them fall in the play-off semi-finals. The following season, Kirk's 10 goals ensured there was no repeat and Northampton gained promotion to League One. During the 2006–07 season Kirk was transfer listed alongside fellow strikers James Quinn and Scott McGleish. However, Kirk was taken off the transfer list at the beginning of the 2007–08 season and rewarded manager Stuart Gray with 3 goals in the first 3 games.

Yeovil Town
Kirk moved to Yeovil Town on 17 January 2008 for an undisclosed fee. He signed a two and a half-year contract. He scored twice in the first three games for his new club. In summer 2008 Yeovil rejected a bid from Morecambe for Kirk, though they went on to sell him to Scottish First Division team Dunfermline Athletic.

Dunfermline Athletic
In August 2008 Kirk signed a three-year contract. He made his debut coming on as a sub against First Division rivals Partick Thistle and scored his first two goals a week later against Queen of the South in a 2–1 win. Kirk has gone on to enjoy the most prolific goal-scoring period of his career with the Pars.

Alloa Athletic
In June 2013 Kirk signed with newly promoted First Division team Alloa Athletic having trained with the club in the latter part of the 2012/13 season after being released by Dunfermline due to the club being in administration.

International
Kirk was capped 11 times by Northern Ireland. His debut came against Hungary in April 2000. After a four-year absence he played against the Czech Republic in October 2009. His most recent appearance was in a friendly against Albania in 2010.

Coaching career
Kirk joined Rangers Academy as a youth coach in March 2015. He returned to Edinburgh in February 2016 to coach Heart of Midlothian's U17 team. In December 2016, Kirk became joint interim manager with Jon Daly following Robbie Neilson's departure.

In August 2020, Kirk was appointed the First Team Manager and Girls' Academy Manager of Hearts Women.

Brechin City 
In June 2021, Kirk was appointed the manager of Highland League side Brechin City.

Honours

Club
Glentoran
Irish Premier League: 1998–99
Irish Cup: 1997–98
Gold Cup: 1998–99
County Antrim Shield: 1998–99

Dunfermline Athletic
Scottish First Division: 2010–11

Individual
SFL Player of the Month: August 2010
SFL Ginger Boot: August 2010

References

External links
 
 
 
 

1979 births
Association footballers from Belfast
Living people
Association football forwards
Association footballers from Northern Ireland
Northern Ireland international footballers
Glentoran F.C. players
Heart of Midlothian F.C. players
Boston United F.C. players
Northampton Town F.C. players
Yeovil Town F.C. players
Dunfermline Athletic F.C. players
Alloa Athletic F.C. players
Scottish Premier League players
Scottish Football League players
English Football League players
NIFL Premiership players
Scottish Professional Football League players
Rangers F.C. non-playing staff
Football managers from Northern Ireland
Scottish Women's Premier League managers
Heart of Midlothian W.F.C. managers
Brechin City F.C. managers
Highland Football League managers